Howard C. Whisler (1931–2007) was an American mycologist. Born in Oakland, California, he attended Berkeley schools and then Palo Alto High School. Howard worked on his undergraduate degree at Oregon State College for two years and then went to the University of California, Berkeley, where he completed a Bachelor of Science degree in plant pathology in 1954. He joined the United States Air Force from 1954 to 1956 stationed in Italy. He returned to University of California, Berkeley after his military life and had finished his doctoral degree with Ralph Emerson in 1960. From 1960 to 1961 he held a post doctoral NATO-NSF Fellowship in France, at the Université de Montpellier. Howard was appointed assistant professor of Botany at McGill University in 1961. He was appointed to the faculty at the University of Washington on March 15, 1963 and worked until he died on September 16, 2007, at the age of 76.[1,2]

Work
Whisler had great admiration for Roland Thaxter and Cap Weston. When Whisler was an undergraduate at the University of California, Berkeley, he was introduced to the study of zoosporic fungi. During his graduate work at University of California, Berkeley he focused on fungi associated with invertebrates, receiving his doctorate in 1960 for a study of the entomogenous fungus Amoebidium parasiticum (Protozoan). He published his first paper on Amoebidium parasiticum (Protozoan) on Daphnia in the journal Nature in 1960. After that, he published a number of articles on zoosporic fungi.[1, 2, 3] Additional publications included those on the Trichomycetes, Entomophthorales, Rubetella inopinata and Carouxella scalaris, with J. F. Manier and L. Rioux.[4] He published many articles on the biology of Coelomomyces.[5, 6, 7] From 1970, he did some research on members of the Oomycota, insect parasites in the Zygomycota and Ascomycota, and even delved for a bit into the Basidiomycota with G. A. Escobar, D. E. McCabe and C. W. Harpel.[1, 8, 9] In the 1990s, Whisler carried out research on Saprolegnia parasitica, an oomycete parasite of Chinook salmon, as well as Woronia polycystis, a hyperparasitic organism that attacks ‘’Saprolegnia’’.

Whisler was an active member of the Mycological Society of America. He was also a founder of the International Society of Evolutionary Protistology with Max Taylor and Lynn Margulis.[2]

Whisler taught a number of graduate students who worked on aquatic fungi. He also followed Emerson's tradition of allowing his students to be sole authors on papers from his lab even though his direction and collaboration were often an important component of the research. So when counted his publication, this articles must be included.

Described species
Enterobryus bifurcatus
Pteromaklron protrudens
Stigmatomyces ceratophorus

Selected publications
Whisler published nearly 35 articles and books about fungi as mosquito parasites.[1]
Whisler, H.C. 1960. Pure culture of the Trichomycete, Amoebidium parasiticum. Nature 186:732-733. doi:10.1038/186732a0
Whisler, H.C. 1963. Observations on some new and unusual enterophilous Phycomycetes. Can. J. Bot. 41:887-900. doi:10.1139/b63-074
Whisler, H.C. 1967. Experimental studies with a new species of Stigmatomyces. Mycologia 60:65-75. doi:10.2307/3757314
Whisler,H.C. and M.S. Fuller. 1968. Preliminary observations of the holdfast of Amoebidium parasiticum. Mycologia 60:1068-1079. doi:10.2307/3757291
Whisler, H.C., S.L. Zebold and J.A. Shemanchuk. 1974. Alternate host for mosquito parasite Coelomomyces. Nature 251:715-716. doi:10.1038/251715a0
Whisler, H.C., S.L. Zebold and J.A. Shemanchuk. 1975. The life history of Coelomomyces psorophorae. Proc. Natl. Acad. Sci. USA 72:693-696.

References

 [1] Ammirati J. F. 2008. Howard Whisler. North American Fungi. 3(3): 1-11.
 [2] http://scua.library.umass.edu/umarmot/whisler-howard-c-howard-clinton/
 [3] Whisler, H.C. 1960. Pure culture of the Trichomycete, Amoebidium parasiticum. Nature. 186:732-733. doi:10.1038/186732a0
 [4] Manier, J.F., L. Rioux and H.C. Whisler. 1961. Rubetella inopinata n. sp. et Carouxella scalaris n.g., n. sp. Trichomycetes parasite de Dashyhelea lithotelmatica Strenzke. Naturalia Monspeliensia. Ser. Bot. 13:25-27.
 [5] Whisler, H.C., J.A. Shemanchuk and L.B. Travland. 1972. Germination of the resistant sporangia of Coelomomyces psorophorae. J.Invertebrate Pathol. 19:139-147.
 [6] Whisler, H.C., S.L. Zebold and J.A. Shemanchuk. 1974. Alternate host for mosquito parasite Coelomomyces. Nature 251:715-716. doi:10.1038/251715a0
 [7] Whisler, H.C., S.L. Zebold and J.A. Shemanchuk. 1975. The life history of Coelomomyces psorophorae. Proc. Natl. Acad. Sci. USA 72:693-696.
 [8] Humber, R. 1976. The systematics of the genus Strongwellsea (Zygomycetes: Entomophthorales). Mycologia 68:1042-1060. doi:10.2307/3758721
 [9] Whisler, H.C. 1994. Founders Lecture : John N. Couch: A founder of entomological mycology. J. Inverte. Pathol. J. Inverteb. Path. 63:225-228. doi:10.1006/jipa.1994.1044

American mycologists
1931 births
2007 deaths